The Darby House, at 301 W. Arcadia Ave. in Dawson Springs, Kentucky was built around 1890.  It was listed on the National Register of Historic Places in 1997.

It was built by Dr. A. G. Darby and served as a boarding house and private residence.

References

National Register of Historic Places in Hopkins County, Kentucky

Houses completed in 1890
1890 establishments in Kentucky
Houses on the National Register of Historic Places in Kentucky
Georgian Revival architecture in Kentucky
Houses in Hopkins County, Kentucky